John Eric Greenwood (known as Jenny Greenwood) was a rugby union international who represented England from 1912 to 1920. He also captained his country. During what would have been the prime of his playing career he fought in the First World War.

Early life
Jenny Greenwood was born on 23 July 1891 in Lewisham. He attended Dulwich College.

Rugby union career

Greenwood learnt his rugby at Dulwich College, before which he had been a keen soccer player. Whilst there he played in an unbeaten first XV in 1909 which contained five future internationals dubbed the 'Famous Five'. These five would all go on to play in the 1913 Varsity match, (and also produced the captains of both Oxford and Cambridge in 1919), and all served in the First World War. They were Eric Loudoun-Shand and Grahame Donald who both went on to play for Scotland, William David Doherty who went on to play for and captain Ireland, Greenwood himself who went on to play for and captain England and the record-breaking Cyril Lowe.

From Dulwich College, Greenwood went to Cambridge University. He was selected to play as a Centre in the 1912 varsity match, and also made his international debut on 8 April 1912 at Parc des Princes in the France vs England match. He was again selected for the 1913 varsity match and again played for England. On his team were two of his former school teammates, CN Lowe and George Doherty, on the opposing side were Eric Loudoun-Shand and Graham Donald also from Dulwich. His international career was then interrupted by the outbreak of the First World War.

He did return to international rugby, and also made a return for Cambridge University in 1919. He captained the side and his opposing captain was his former school teammate Loudoun-Shand. It was due to a chance encounter with Eric Loudoun-Shand that Greenwood was allowed to captain the Cambridge side that year. It was within the prerogative of the Oxford captain to deny Cambridge the chance to field Greenwood, who had left the University just prior to the war. However, the long association proved to be to Greenwood's good fortune. Eric Loudoun-Shand played that match with a severely injured arm, an injury from the Great War. So bad was this injury that he later had to have the arm amputated.

Of the 13 matches Greenwood played for his national side he was on the winning side on 11 occasions.
He played his final match for England on 20 March 1920 at Twickenham in the England vs Scotland match.

References

1891 births
1975 deaths
England international rugby union players
English rugby union players
People educated at Dulwich College
Rugby union forwards
Rugby union players from Lewisham
Military personnel from London
British military personnel of World War I